N70 may refer to:

Roads
 N70 road (Ireland)
 N-70 National Highway, in Pakistan
 N70 highway, in the Philippines
 Nebraska Highway 70, in the United States

Other uses 
 N70 (Long Island bus)
 IBM NetVista N70, a computer
 Nihon N-70 Cygnus, a Japanese powered sailplane
 Nikon N70, a camera
 Nokia N70, a mobile phone
 Toyota Hilux (N70), a Japanese pickup truck